637 Chrysothemis is a Themistian asteroid.

References

External links 
 
 

Themis asteroids
Chrysothemis
19070311
Chrysothemis